Andrews Run is a  long 3rd order tributary to Brokenstraw Creek.  It is classed as a cold water fishery by the Pennsylvania Fish and Boat Commission.

Course
Andrews Run is formed at the confluence of Birch Springs Run and Rattlesnake Run in Warren County, Pennsylvania about 3 miles south-southeast of Pittsfield, Pennsylvania.  It then flows northeast to meet Brokenstraw Creek at Pittsfield, Pennsylvania.

Watershed
Andrews Run drains  of the Pennsylvania High Plateau province and is underlaid by the Venango Formation, Corry Sandstone through Riceville Formation and the Shenango through Cuyahoga Group. The watershed receives an average of 43.1 in/year of precipitation and has a wetness index of 389.62.  The watershed is about 79% forested.

See also 
 List of rivers of Pennsylvania

References

Rivers of Pennsylvania
Tributaries of the Allegheny River
Rivers of Warren County, Pennsylvania